Season 1992–93

Scottish Premier Division

Final League table

Scottish League Cup

UEFA Cup

Scottish Cup

See also
List of Hibernian F.C. seasons

References

External links
Hibernian 1992/1993 results and fixtures, Soccerbase

Hibernian F.C. seasons
Hibernian